Scaevola parvibarbata is a species of flowering plant in the family Goodeniaceae. It is an upright herb with fan-shaped mauve or greenish flowers and grows in New South Wales, Queensland, South Australia and the Northern Territory.

Description

Taxonomy and naming
Scaevola parvibarbata was first formally described in 1986 by Roger Charles Carolin and the description was published in Flora of South Australia. The specific epithet (parvibarbata) means "small" and "bearded".

Distribution and habitat
This scaevola grows in dry, sandy locations in New South Wales, South Australia, Queensland and the Northern Territory.

References

 

parvibarbata
Flora of Queensland
Flora of the Northern Territory
Flora of South Australia
Flora of New South Wales